The 2016 United States presidential election in New Jersey was held on Tuesday, November 8, 2016, as part of the 2016 United States presidential election in which all 50 states plus the District of Columbia participated. New Jersey voters chose electors to represent them in the Electoral College via a popular vote, pitting the Republican Party's nominee, businessman Donald Trump, and running mate Indiana Governor Mike Pence against Democratic Party nominee, former Secretary of State Hillary Clinton, and her running mate Virginia Senator Tim Kaine. New Jersey has 14 electoral votes in the Electoral College.

Clinton won the state with 55.5% of the vote over Trump's 41.35%, or a 14-point margin. Despite her victory in the state, Clinton's vote share was slightly poorer than the vote shares President Barack Obama got from the state in 2008 and 2012. This was the first time since 1976 that New Jersey did not vote for the same candidate as neighboring Pennsylvania, and the first time since 1932 that New Jersey voted Democratic while Pennsylvania voted Republican. Donald Trump became the first Republican to win the White House without carrying Somerset County since Benjamin Harrison in 1888.

Primary elections
New Jersey's presidential primaries were on June 7, 2016, with the Democratic, Republican, and Libertarian parties participating. Registered members of each party could only vote in their party's primary, while voters who were unaffiliated could choose any 1 primary in which to vote.

Democratic primary

Two candidates appeared on the Democratic presidential primary ballot:
Bernie Sanders
Hillary Clinton

Republican primary
3 candidates appeared on the Republican presidential primary ballot:
Ted Cruz (withdrawn prior to primary)
John Kasich (withdrawn prior to primary)
Donald Trump

General election

Predictions

Candidate ballot access:
 Hillary Clinton/Tim Kaine, Democratic
 Donald Trump/Mike Pence, Republican
 Darrell Castle/Scott Bradley, Constitution
 Rocky De La Fuente/Michael Steinberg, American Delta Party
 Gary Johnson/Bill Weld, Libertarian
 Alyson Kennedy/Osborne Hart, Socialist Workers Party
 Gloria La Riva/Eugene Puryear, Socialism and Liberation
 Monica Moorehead/Lamont Lilly, Workers World Party
 Jill Stein/Ajamu Baraka, Green Party

Results

Results by county

Counties that flipped from Democratic to Republican

Gloucester (largest municipality: Washington Township)
Salem (largest city: Salem)

By congressional district
Clinton won 7 of 12  congressional districts. Trump and Clinton each won a district held by the other party.

Analysis
Hillary Clinton's 55.5% of the vote was 2.9% less than Barack Obama's win in the state in 2012. Overall, the trend from 2012 to 2016 was that suburban areas of central and northern New Jersey voted more Democratic, while the shore and southern New Jersey voted more Republican. Clinton's most notable improvements over Obama in 2012 were seen in Union, Somerset, and Morris Counties. In Morris, Clinton came within 5% of winning the county, which had not voted for a Democratic presidential candidate since 1964. Clinton's stronger performance in the suburban towns of north-central New Jersey, such as Summit, Westfield, and Bridgewater, helped her narrowly win the 7th congressional district.

On the other hand, southern New Jersey, especially Cumberland County and Salem County, voted significantly more Republican than they had in 2012. For example, even though Cumberland County voted Democratic in both 2012 and 2016, Clinton won it by just 6%, whereas Obama won it by nearly 24% in 2012. Donald Trump became the first Republican to win Gloucester County since George H. W. Bush in 1988. He also flipped the swing county of Salem, which he won by a commanding 15-point margin, signaling its shift to the right. Additionally, the four shore counties of Monmouth, Ocean, Atlantic, and Cape May all voted more Republican than they had in 2012. While Mitt Romney had won these four counties collectively by around 6% in 2012, Trump won them by 17% in 2016.

See also
 United States presidential elections in New Jersey
 Presidency of Donald Trump
 2016 Democratic Party presidential primaries
 2016 Republican Party presidential primaries
 Statewide opinion polling for the 2016 United States presidential election in New Jersey

References

New Jersey
2016
United States presidential